"Tender Heart" is a 1994 song by Norwegian Eurodance group , consisting of model and singer , Njaal Lie and Svenna Mohaugen. It was released as the first single from their only album, Compromise (1995), and peaked at number six on both the Norwegian single chart, VG-lista, and the radio chart Ti i skuddet. A music video was also produced to promote the single.

Track listing
 CD maxi
"Tender Heart" (Radio Version) – 3:33
"Tender Heart" (Stripped Club Mix) – 4:04
"Tender Heart" (D.A.C. Remix) – 5:53
"Tender Heart" (Trancefiction Mix) – 6:13
"Tender Heart" (Ambient Mix) – 4:01  

 CD maxi (Remix)
"Tender Heart" (Radioremix) – 4:25
"Tender Heart" (Original Radiomix) – 3:35  
"Tender Heart" (U.K. Clubmix) – 6:11
"Tender Heart" (Amsterdam Clubmix) – 5:21
"Tender Heart" (Deep Trance Voyage) – 5:26

Charts

References

 

1994 debut singles
1994 songs
Trancylvania songs
EMI Records singles
English-language Norwegian songs